Stainforth may refer to two places in Yorkshire, England:
Stainforth, North Yorkshire, England, a village near Settle
Stainforth, South Yorkshire, England, a town near Doncaster

See also
 Stainforth (surname)